Afrita hanem (English: Little Miss Devil) is a 1949 Egyptian film about Asfour, a poor singer, played by Syrian musician Farid Al Atrache, who falls in love with Aleya, the somewhat spoiled daughter of his boss.

Plot

Asfour wants to marry Aleya, but her father won't let the marriage happen due to Asfour's class status. Asfour turns to a genie for help, but the genie, a female genie named Kahramana, played by noted Egyptian actress and dancer Samia Gamal, falls in love with Asfour instead, and tries to manipulate his desires.

Reception
According to the British Film Institute’s book 100 Film Musicals, Afrita hanem critiques modernity:  “Running through all these films (as through so many Indian films), exploring moral dilemmas in bourgeois family settings, is a discourse in which western modernity – cars, clothes, manners – is viewed negatively in relation to traditional values. The sage who presides over the genie in Afrita Hanem pops up from time to time to deliver homilies about materialistic greed and selfishness.”

References

External links 
 

1949 films
Egyptian speculative fiction films
1940s Arabic-language films
Films directed by Henry Barakat
Egyptian musical comedy films
1949 musical comedy films
American black-and-white films